Ralph Strangis is a 7-time Emmy Award winning NHL play-by-play broadcaster who began calling NHL hockey in 1990-91 with the Minnesota North Stars, working alongside Hall of Fame broadcaster Al Shaver. Strangis relocated to Dallas with the Stars in 1993, took over the play-by-play chair in 1995-96, and remained there until April 2015.

Ralph continues to call NHL hockey on television and radio networks, working as a freelancer for Westwood One, NBC Radio, NHL International and NHL Network.  He has called 4 Winter Classics, 3 Stadium Series games, the 2018 Olympic Winter Games (men’s and women’s ice hockey) in PyeongChang and the 2019 NHL Global Series opener in Berlin, Lausanne, and Prague.  

For the 2016-17 NHL season, Strangis worked 26 games for the Los Angeles Kings TV on Fox Sports West filling in for the ailing Bob Miller.  

Alongside covering the NHL, Strangis also works as a consultant, educator, trainer, writer, actor, corporate speaker and emcee.

Biography

3rd Period Media/Senseless Productions/Consulting 
Ralph’s broadcasting and media career started with his first paying radio job in 1977 at KTWN in Anoka, Minnesota and has run on several parallel tracks.  His robust production experience began at the Emmy Award Winning GRFX/NOVOCOM in Los Angeles in 1983 and has continued through the present. He has supervised, written, produced, executive produced, hosted and narrated long and short form documentaries, features, training and corporate videos, podcasts and audio projects, seminars and live events.

Ralph’s 44 years working in so many areas of media, sports media, writing, acting and producing content and training and development and work as an adjunct professor and curriculum creator (formalized with his 2016 BAAS from the University of North Texas in “Applied Technology and Performance Improvement” makes him a sought after consultant, talent and staff evaluator and trainer, and he has experience advising corporate clients and professional sports teams.

Some of Ralph’s projects over the years include – “Deep in the Hearts of Texans” (writer, producer, host), 1993-94 inaugural season Dallas Stars highlight video, “The Cold War” (writer, producer), “Behind the Masc” (director, producer, writer, goaltending instructional video with Andy Moog), “Coca Cola Future Stars" (director, producer, writer training video with Bob Gainey), "Hospitality Suite" (executive producer, producer, lead actor), an American play by Roger Rueff at Gilley’s Dallas, “Citizen Hicks” (working title, a project in development of which he is associate producer, researcher, and long-form documentary interviewer), and “The Priest and the Pragmatist” (executive producer, producer, co-writer, co-host Podcast available on itunes with Father Joshua Whitfield).

Acting 
Ralph’s formal acting career began in the early 2000’s with stage roles in Dallas area theaters that include – Dr. Mitchell Lovell, “Murder at the Howard Johnson’s”, Coach Michael, “Rounding Third”, Chef, “Don’t Dress for Dinner, Various roles “Almost Maine”, HBO Executive, “Pure Country” (reading) Casa Manana, Fort Worth, Texas, and Larry Mann, “Hospitality Suite”, Gilley’s Dallas. In 2004, Ralph had a credited, speaking role as the NCAA Tournament Announcer for the Texas Western/Kansas game in the Disney/Jerry Bruckheimer film “Glory Road”. Ralph has had other roles in numerous short films, independent films and stage plays, and his latest role in Palm Springs at the Palm Canyon Theater as Otto Frank in Diary of Anne Frank garnered him the Coachella Valley’s “Desert Theater League Award” for best lead actor in a drama.

Writing 
Ralph’s writing career began very early with copywriting and technical writing for long and short educational, training and sports projects in the late 1980’s and continues through the present. He was a regular OP-ED contributor for the Dallas Morning News from 2015-2018, winning the “Texas Press Association 2016” 3rd Place Award, General Commentary Portfolio and the “2017 Best of the West” National/regional award, General Commentary for his work. He has worked as a sports columnist, a biography writer, a features writer for NHL.com and as a ghost speechwriter for select NHL Hall of Fame member’s acceptance speeches, jersey retirements, or special ceremony speeches. His first novel “Saving Lenny Franks” was self-published in 2018 and is available on Amazon.

Personal life 
Ralph currently resides in the Coachella Valley in California where he continues to freelance as an NHL play-by-play broadcaster, works as a consultant, advisor, talent coach, trainer, corporate lecturer and emcee, writer, actor and educator.  

On February 27, 2021, Ralph turned 60 and has dedicated this year, as he continues to battle early stage bladder cancer to completing 60 bucket list items, beginning with a 60-mile bike ride with his daughter on his 60th birthday. Ralph is documenting the items for a “60 in 60” documentary and is updating his progress on www.ralphstrangis.com

Ralph is divorced, has one daughter, travels extensively and is an avid reader and theater goer.

Early career 
Strangis honed his play-by-play skills in Minnesota and Wisconsin, starting with his first paying radio job at the age of 16.  He later worked on local Public-access television stations doing play by play for a wide variety of high school and college sports.  Strangis is especially remembered for his broadcasts of Bloomington Kennedy and Bloomington Jefferson high school hockey that appeared on Bloomington Educational Cable.  Strangis' earliest national exposure was as play-by-play man and ring announcer for the American Wrestling Association on ESPN, where he worked alongside Lee Marshall, and later Eric Bischoff, in the waning days of that promotion.

Although Strangis had a great deal of broadcast experience, his tryout as color commentator on the Minnesota North Stars radio network was a longshot; other better-known sportscasters received more air time during the auditioning process.  The five potential candidates split up a game as guest commentators alongside Al Shaver, then voice of the Minnesota North Stars.  The two better-known talents each took a period and then the three longshots split up the third, with Strangis going last.  When Al Shaver was asked who he liked the best, he chose Strangis.  Ralph shone in his audition, with the perfect ability to complement Shaver's play-by-play with insights from the players and his own intimate knowledge of the game.  When the Stars moved to Dallas in 1993, Shaver decided to not to migrate south with the franchise and retired.  After three more seasons as color commentator (teaming with Mike Fornes), Strangis migrated to the play-by-play mic, effectively cementing his status as the "Voice of the Stars."

Ralph and Razor
In 1996, former NHL goalie Daryl "Razor" Reaugh joined Strangis as the Stars' color commentator, thus creating the popular duo "Ralph and Razor".  The two achieved a near cult-like following in the city of Dallas, so much so that, even though fan support and Dallas' media market size could easily support separate radio and television broadcast teams, the Stars elected to continue simulcasting the pair.  In 2008, the Stars added in-arena radio (on 97.5FM) allowing fans yet another opportunity to hear the popular team.

In a poll conducted by the Dallas Morning News, his most famous line was voted the most memorable moment in Dallas history. "Hull scores! Yes! Yes! Yes! The Stars win the Stanley Cup, the Stars win the Stanley Cup!"

Other appearances
He was a contestant on the game show Press Your Luck on the episodes that aired on May 28 and 29, 1984 and Strangis won $7,431 in cash and prizes. Strangis also appears often in commercials for the Stars that air on TV and on the jumbo-tron at the Stars' home arena.

References

External links

Official Broadcaster Bio on Dallas Stars Website
"Strangis Takes His Act To The Stage" at the Dallas Stars' official website

Year of birth missing (living people)
Living people
Contestants on American game shows
Dallas Stars announcers
Minnesota North Stars announcers
National Hockey League broadcasters
Professional wrestling announcers
People from Coppell, Texas